The Armenian Tumbler is a breed of tumblers that originated in Armenia, where they are bred for their color and flight. As the name suggests the Armenian Tumbler is a part of the Tumbler family. The species, like most pigeon species, has the ability to fly.

Appearance
The Armenian Tumbler usually has distinct markings, many having black necks with black tails; others with yellow tails and yellow necks, also known as a bellneck. Their feathers are clear and smooth as well as being strong, they also can have feathers on their feet. The Armenian Tumbler has a round head, which can be fully crested or non-crested. They usually have a medium-sized light pink beak although sometimes have black beaks. Their eye color can be pearl, orange, and yellow and they can also have two eye colors, one for each eye.

Flight
The Armenian Tumbler can fly for about two to three hours. Typical for the tumbler species, they can spin and roll while in flight.

See also
List of pigeon breeds

External links
www.rooftoppigeons.com